The 1952 New South Wales Rugby Football League premiership was the forty-fifth season of the rugby league competition based in Sydney. Ten teams from across Sydney contested for the J. J. Giltinan Shield during the season which culminated in a grand final between Western Suburbs and South Sydney.

Teams
The tail-end of the season was played without star players selected to go on the Australian national team’s 1952–1953 Kangaroo Tour.

Ladder

Finals
The 1952 season saw North Sydney reach the finals for the first time since 1943. Their win over St. George in their semi-final would prove North Sydney’s last victory in a first grade semi-final until their 1991 major preliminary semi-final against Manly-Warringah.

Grand Final

The rl1908 reference transcribes Sean Fagan’s 2002 interview with Souths captain-coach Jack Rayner fuelling the suggestion that dubious refereeing decisions cost the Rabbitohs the 1952 title and prevented Souths from stringing together all six premierships of 1950 to 1955. However it cannot be argued that the Western Suburbs club were themselves a force of the 1950s, and their 1952 achievement was undeniably remarkable as they played the whole second half of the season and the finals without their stars Frank Stanmore, Keith Holman and Arthur Collinson who had all left with the touring Kangaroos to England and France.

Wests finished as minor premiers due in great part to their undefeated nine-game streak in the first full round of the 1952 season. In the final they met Souths who were seeking their third premiership in a row.

The controversy centered on a disallowed Rabbitohs try early in the game. Souths’ Frank Threlfo made a break and slipped the ball to Ken Macreadie who was in under the posts. Referee George Bishop ruled the pass forward and disallowed the try. In the interview Rayner also comments on the lopsided penalty count.

However the record-books show that Wests scored six tries to two, winning the match 22–12 and the club’s fourth premiership. Wests’ Hec Farrell and Souths’ Bryan Orrock were sent-off for fighting and went before the judiciary charged with kicking. Wests' coach Tom McMahon became the first coach to win a premiership in his debut coaching season.

Ironically, ten years later Wests would again threaten to break a string of premiership wins – the 1962 and 1963 Magpie sides both came close to ceasing St. George's long run – but again several refereeing controversies would affect the outcome. Both the 1962 and 1963 Grand Finals have been said to have been decided by questionable calls from referee Darcy Lawler and on those occasion Wests would be on the wrong end of disputed rulings.

Western Suburbs 22 (Tries: Schofield 2, Fitzgerald, Dines, Bain, McLean. Goals: Bain 2.)

South Sydney 12 (Tries: Smailes, Macreadie. Goals: Graves 3.)

Player statistics
The following statistics are as of the conclusion of Round 18.

Top 5 point scorers

Top 5 try scorers

Top 5 goal scorers

References

External links
Rugby League Tables – Season 1952 AFL Tables
rl1908.com Sean Fagan's RL History Site
Results:1951-60 at rabbitohs.com.au
1952 J J Giltinan Shield at rleague.com
NSWRFL season 1952 at rugbyleagueproject.org

New South Wales Rugby League premiership
NSWRFL Season